Kababina is a genus of Australian sheetweb spiders that was first described by V. T. Davies in 1995.

Species
 it contains nine species, found in Queensland: K. formartine is misspelled as "formatine" in the heading, but the correct spelling is "formartine".
Kababina alta Davies, 1995 (type) – Australia (Queensland)
Kababina aquilonia Davies, 1995 – Australia (Queensland)
Kababina colemani Davies, 1995 – Australia (Queensland)
Kababina covacevichae Davies, 1995 – Australia (Queensland)
Kababina formartine Davies, 1995 – Australia (Queensland)
Kababina inferna Davies, 1995 – Australia (Queensland)
Kababina isley Davies, 1995 – Australia (Queensland)
Kababina superna Davies, 1995 – Australia (Queensland)
Kababina yungaburra Davies, 1995 – Australia (Queensland)

See also
 Carbinea
 List of Stiphidiidae species

References

Araneomorphae genera
Spiders of Australia
Stiphidiidae
Taxa named by Valerie Todd Davies